Ezekiel David Fryers (born 9 September 1992) is an English professional footballer who plays as a left-back for AFC Eskilstuna. 

He began his career at Manchester United where he made his first team debut appearance, he left United and was bought by Belgian club Standard Liège, where he spent a year before returning to England with Tottenham Hotspur. After another season, he was sold to Crystal Palace, where he made appearances again in the first team. He spent time on loan at Rotherham United and Ipswich Town before he was released. He signed for Barnsley in 2017, but was again released at the end of the 2018–19 season and joined Swindon Town. He left Swindon after his contract expired in 2021, ultimately signing for Stockport County until the end of the 2021–22 season, but he left after four months.

Fryers is a youth international, having played for the England under-16, under-17 and under-19 teams.

Career

Manchester United 
Fryers began his football career at Fletcher Moss Rangers. During the 2010–11 season, Fryers suffered a serious knee injury that kept him out for most of the season. Fryers made his senior debut for Manchester United in the League Cup on 20 September 2011, starting alongside Michael Carrick in central defence in United's third round 3–0 victory over rivals Leeds United. He then played in their 3–0 fourth round win against Aldershot Town on 25 October, appearing as a left-back. On 2 November, he was a late substitute for Jonny Evans during a 2–0 win against Oțelul Galați in a Champions League group stage match at Old Trafford. He made his Premier League debut in a game against Wolverhampton Wanderers, coming on as a substitute for Patrice Evra in the 68th minute; the game finished 4–1. On 26 December 2011, Fryers continued to press for more inclusions as a 46th-minute substitute for Jonny Evans in a league match against Wigan Athletic.

In February 2012, Sky Sports carried a story suggesting that Fryers could follow fellow academy product Ravel Morrison out of Old Trafford at the end of the 2011–12 season. On 4 July 2012, Sir Alex Ferguson stated in an interview: "We haven't heard anything from Zeki Fryers, I don't know what's happening there but he's not been in touch with the club. His agent hasn't been in touch with the club and I can only assume he'll be back for training."

Standard Liège 
Fryers spent the summer training with Tottenham Hotspur ahead of a proposed transfer, but the two clubs were unable to agree on a compensation package (in England, when a player under the age of 23 leaves a club at the end of his contract, his new club must pay a fee to his old club as compensation for having trained him up). Belgian club Standard Liège also expressed interest in Fryers, and as they are not an English club, they did not have to pay Manchester United the same level of compensation. Fryers signed a two-year contract with Liège on 23 August 2012. Fryers played in seven matches for Standard, but with the sacking of Ron Jans in November, he was left out of the squad and ultimately reported to his agent that he was homesick.

Tottenham Hotspur 
With Fryers out of favour in Belgium, Tottenham renewed their interest in him in the January 2013 transfer window and reached an agreement with Standard Liège to sign him. The transfer was criticised by the then Manchester United manager Sir Alex Ferguson, who accused Tottenham of "blatant manipulation" of the rules, having attempted to sign Fryers directly from United in the previous transfer window. Upon signing, Fryers was made part of Tottenham's development squad. During the Asia Cup competition, in July 2013, Tottenham brought Fryers on as a substitute, where he played at left-back for the remainder of the game.

Crystal Palace 
On 1 September 2014, Fryers signed a three-year deal with Crystal Palace for an undisclosed fee. The defender was released from his contract on 30 June 2017.

Loan moves 
After making only one three-minute substitute appearance in the League for Crystal Palace, Fryers joined Rotherham United on a one-month loan on 16 January 2015. On 26 March 2015, Fryers signed for Ipswich Town on loan until the end of the 2014–15 season, alongside Crystal Palace teammate Jonny Williams.

Barnsley 
On 1 July 2017, it was announced that Fryers had joined Championship club Barnsley on a three-year contract.

He was released by Barnsley at the end of the 2018–19 season.

Swindon Town 
After his release from Barnsley, Fryers signed for Swindon Town on a two-year deal. On 14 May 2021 it was announced that he would leave Swindon at the end of the season, following the expiry of his contract.

Stockport County 
After being a free agent for under four months, on 11 September, Stockport County announced that they signed Fryers on a one-year deal. Fryers left Stockport after four months with the club, having made six appearances.

Welling United 
On 2 April 2022, Fryers signed for National League South side Welling United.

Macclesfield 
On 19 May 2022, Fryers signed for Northern Premier League Division One West side Macclesfield but left by mutual consent in October 2022.

In February 2023, Fryers joined Superettan side AFC Eskilstuna on a deal until the end of the season.

Career statistics

Honours 
Swindon Town
EFL League Two: 2019–20

References

External links 
Zeki Fryers at tottenhamhotspur.com

1992 births
Living people
People educated at North Cestrian Grammar School
Black British sportsmen
Footballers from Manchester
English footballers
England youth international footballers
Association football defenders
Fletcher Moss Rangers F.C. players
Manchester United F.C. players
Standard Liège players
Tottenham Hotspur F.C. players
Crystal Palace F.C. players
Rotherham United F.C. players
Ipswich Town F.C. players
Barnsley F.C. players
Swindon Town F.C. players
Stockport County F.C. players
Welling United F.C. players
Macclesfield F.C. players
Premier League players
Belgian Pro League players
English Football League players
National League (English football) players
English expatriate footballers
Expatriate footballers in Belgium
English expatriate sportspeople in Belgium
AFC Eskilstuna players
English expatriate sportspeople in Sweden
Expatriate footballers in Sweden